Bacot is a surname. Notable people with the surname include:

Armando Bacot (born 2000), American basketball player
Arthur William Bacot (1866–1922), English entomologist
H. Parrott Bacot (1941–2020), American art historian
J. Carter Bacot (1933–2005), president of The Bank of New York for eight years and chairman and CEO for sixteen years
Jacques Bacot (1877–1965), explorer and pioneering French Tibetologist
John Bacot (1821–1888), New Zealand politician